With an average elevation of  above sea level, Albania is one of the most mountainous countries in the world. It has a mountainous terrain that covers more than 70% of its total territory.

Albania can be divided into four main regions: Northern Range, Central Range, Southern Range and Western Lowlands. The most notable topographical features are the Ceraunian Mountains, Dinaric Alps, Korab Mountains, Pindus Mountains and the Skanderbeg Mountains. 
The highest peak is Korab standing at  elevation above sea level on the border with the Republic of North Macedonia. It is one of only two summits in Europe, which is the highest peak for more than one country. It is also the 18th most prominent mountain peak in Europe.

List of mountains in Albania

See also 

 Protected areas of Albania
 Geography of Albania
 Mountain passes in Albania

References 

 

 

 
Albania
Mountains
Alb